The rusty whistler (Pachycephala hyperythra) is a species of bird in the family Pachycephalidae. It is endemic to lowland mountain areas of New Guinea. Its natural habitat is subtropical or tropical moist lowland forests.

Nomenclature
Alternate names for the rusty whistler include the Bornean mountain whistler, brownish whistler, rufous-breasted whistler and rusty-breasted whistler. The latter name should not be confused with the species of the same name, Pachycephala fulvotincta.

Subspecies
Four subspecies are recognized:
 P. h. hyperythra Salvadori, 1876 : Wandammen, Weyland & Foja Mountains ; upper Fly, Palmer and Ok Tedi rivers.
 P. h. sepikiana Stresemann, 1921 : mountains northern New Guinea.
 P. h. reichenowi Rothschild & E. J. O. Hartert, 1911 : Saruwaged Range.
 P. h. salvadorii Rothschild, 1897 : mountains east from Lake Kutubu and Mount Bosavi.

References

rusty whistler
Birds of New Guinea
Endemic fauna of New Guinea
rusty whistler
Taxonomy articles created by Polbot